The Museum Sorolla (Spanish: Museo Sorolla) is a public museum located in Madrid, Spain. It features work by the artist Joaquín Sorolla, as well as by members of his family such as his daughter Elena.

The building was originally the artist's house and was converted into a museum after the death of his widow. Designed by Enrique María Repullés, it was declared Bien de Interés Cultural in 1962. The principal rooms continue to be furnished as they were during the artist's life, including Sorolla's large, well-lit studio, where the walls are filled with his canvasses. Other rooms are used as galleries to display Sorolla's paintings, while the upstairs rooms are a gallery for temporary exhibitions. In 2014, these rooms presented an exhibition of David Palacin photographs of the ballet Sorolla produced by the Spanish National Dance Company.

Selected collection highlights

See also
 List of single-artist museums

References

External links

 
 Overview of temporary exhibitions held at the Sorolla Museum (in Spanish)
 Sorolla Museum within Google Arts & Culture
 Listing for the Museo Sorolla at the Artist's Studio Museum Network
  Vayamadrid.com: The-intimate-museo-sorolla

Museums in Madrid
Art museums and galleries in Madrid
Biographical museums in Spain
Houses in Spain
Museums devoted to one artist
Bien de Interés Cultural landmarks in Madrid
Buildings and structures in Almagro neighborhood, Madrid